Guyana is divided into 10 Regions:

Each Region is administered by a Regional Democratic Council (RDC) which is headed by a Chairman. The Regions are divided into neighbourhood councils, known as Neighbourhood Democratic Councils (NDCs).

The current regional structure was established by the Local Democratic Organs Act in 1980. The hyphenated names indicate the name of the rivers that define their border.

Historical divisions 
Previous regional names:

Regions of Guyana (1971) 

 East Berbice-Corentyne
 East Demerara-West Coast Berbice
 Mazaruni Potaro
 North West
 Rupununi
 West Demerara-Essequibo Coast

Regions of British Guiana (1958) 

 East Berbice
 West Berbice
 East Demerara
 West Demerara
 Essequibo
 Essequibo Islands
 North west (hinterlands)
 Mazaruni-Potaro (hinterlands)
 Rupununi (hinterlands)

Colonial counties (before 1958) 

 Essequibo
 Demerara
 Berbice

See also
 ISO 3166-2:GY
 List of Caribbean First-level Subdivisions by Total Area
List of Guyanese regions by Human Development Index

References

External links
 

 
Subdivisions of Guyana
Guyana, Regions
Regions, Guyana
Guyana geography-related lists
Politics of Guyana